Venom is a character appearing in American comic books published by Marvel Comics. The character is a sentient alien symbiote with an amorphous, liquid-like form, who survives by bonding with a host, usually human. This dual-life form receives enhanced powers and usually refers to itself as "Venom". The symbiote was originally introduced as a living alien costume in The Amazing Spider-Man #252 (May 1984), with a full first appearance as Venom in The Amazing Spider-Man #300 (May 1988).

The Venom symbiote's first human host was Spider-Man himself, who eventually discovered its true nefarious nature and separated himself from the creature in The Amazing Spider-Man #258 (November 1984)—with a brief rejoining five months later in Web of Spider-Man #1. The symbiote went on to merge with other hosts, beginning with Eddie Brock, its second and best-known host, with whom it first became Venom. Venom has endured as one of Spider-Man's most prominent villains, and was initially regarded as one of his three archenemies, alongside the Green Goblin and Doctor Octopus. Since his debut however, Venom has evolved into an antiheroic figure, slowly distancing himself from his initial goal to ruin Spider-Man's life to try and do good instead, even putting aside his differences with and helping Spider-Man at times. After Brock, numerous other hosts for Venom followed; some of the most notable are the villain Mac Gargan, who was the main incarnation of Venom from 2005 to 2009, and Flash Thompson, who became the superhero Agent Venom from 2011 to 2016, before Venom returned to Brock in 2017. Venom's most recent and current host is Brock's biological son, Dylan. Venom is also depicted as having spawned several children—Scream, Lasher, Phage, Agony, Riot, Mania, Sleeper, and most notably, Carnage, who becomes Venom's archenemy after being bound to serial killer Cletus Kasady.

A fan-favorite character and well-known figure in popular culture, Venom (primarily the Eddie Brock incarnation) is the most recognizable Spider-Man antagonist not first introduced during the original Lee/Ditko run. He has been featured in various media adaptations of Spider-Man over the years, including feature films, television series and video games. The character was portrayed by Tobey Maguire and Topher Grace in Spider-Man 3 (2007), with Tom Hardy primarily portraying the character in the Sony's Spider-Man Universe films Venom (2018) and Venom: Let There Be Carnage (2021), as well as an uncredited post-credit scene appearance in the Marvel Cinematic Universe film Spider-Man: No Way Home (2021).

The Eddie Brock incarnation of Venom is among Spider-Man's most famous rogues, and is regarded by many as a dark reflection of the hero. Comics journalist and historian Mike Conroy writes of the character: "What started out as a replacement costume for Spider-Man turned into one of the Marvel web-slinger's greatest nightmares". Venom was rated 33rd on Empire's 50 Greatest Comic Book Characters, and ranked 22nd on IGN's 100 Greatest Comic Villains of All Time.

Conception and creation
The original idea of a new costume for Spider-Man that would later become the character Venom was conceived by a Marvel Comics reader from Norridge, Illinois named Randy Schueller. In 1982, Jim Shooter, Marvel's editor-in-chief at the time, sent Schueller a letter acknowledging Marvel's interest in the idea, which they ended up purchasing from him for $220. Shooter came up with the idea of switching Spider-Man to a black-and-white costume, possibly influenced by the intended costume design for the new Spider-Woman; artist Mike Zeck designed it.

Writer/artist John Byrne says on his website that he conceived a costume of self-healing biological material when he was the artist on Iron Fist — to explain how that character's costume was constantly being torn and then apparently repaired by the next issue. Byrne says explaining that he ended up not using the idea on that title, but that Roger Stern later asked him if he could use the idea for Spider-Man's alien costume. Stern in turn plotted the issue in which the costume first appeared but then left the title. It was writer Tom DeFalco and artist Ron Frenz who established that the costume was a sentient alien being that was vulnerable to high sonic energy during their run on The Amazing Spider-Man that preceded Michelinie's.

With the nature of the symbiote established Michelinie felt it could serve a character concept he had been toying with for sometime. When Michelinie first began working on Spider-Man stories he noted that the most unique ability Spider-Man possessed as a superhero was his spider sense, which Michelinie claimed gave the character a level of invulnerability on par or better than much stronger Marvel superheroes. While other Spider-Man antagonists such as The Green Goblin and Mysterio had been able to temporarily disable Spider-Man's spider sense through chemical means, Michelinie was fascinated by the idea of a villain who could permanently evade Spider-Man's spider sense and what kind of consequences that would have on both Spider-Man as a superhero and Peter Parker's personal life. After initially coming up with characters who were able to evade Spider-Man's spider sense through cybernetic means that were rejected by Marvel editors, Michelinie posited that the symbiote would make a human host be able to evade Spider-Man's spider sense through it being mutated by absorbing Spider-Man's genetic material when Spider-Man was its host. This idea was approved by Marvel editors and Michelinie was given the green light to further refine the character.

The symbiote was first introduced as Spider-Man's new black costume in The Amazing Spider-Man #252 (May 1984) as part of a story called "Homecoming!" The story takes place after Spider-Man's return from the events of the miniseries Secret Wars, where he first obtains the black costume. The full first appearance of Venom is in The Amazing Spider-Man #300 (May 1988), after the symbiote bonds with Eddie Brock.

Publication history

Hosts

Spider-Man (Peter Parker)

The story of how Spider-Man gets his new black costume is recounted in Marvel Super Heroes Secret Wars #8 (December 1984), in which writer Jim Shooter and artist Mike Zeck depicted the heroes and villains of the Marvel Universe transported to another planet called Battleworld by a being called the Beyonder. After Spider-Man's costume is ruined from battles with the villains, he is directed by Thor and the Hulk to a room at the heroes' base where they inform him a machine can read his thoughts and instantly fabricate any type of clothing. Choosing a machine he believes to be the correct one, Spider-Man causes a black sphere to appear before him, which spreads over his body, dissolving the tattered old costume and covering his body to form a new black and white costume. To Spider-Man's surprise, the costume can mimic street clothes and provides a seemingly inexhaustible and stronger supply of webbing.

During their run on The Amazing Spider-Man, writer Tom DeFalco and artist Ron Frenz established that the costume was a sentient alien symbiote that was vulnerable to both fire and high sonic energy. It was in that storyline that the costume would envelop Peter Parker while he slept, and go out at night to fight crime, leaving Parker inexplicably exhausted in the morning. Parker had the costume examined by Reed Richards, who discovered that it was alive, and when Parker realized it was trying to permanently bond to Parker's body, he rejected it, and it was subsequently contained by the Fantastic Four. The symbiote escaped and bonded again to Parker, who used sound waves from a cathedral's church bell to repel it. But the symbiote had grown an emotional attachment to Peter, so he willingly left Peter's unconscious body and moved him to safety before disappearing.

In Go Down Swinging, when Norman Osborn got bonded to the Carnage symbiote, Spider-Man rebonds to the symbiote in an attempt to stop Osborn, now calling himself Red Goblin, while forgiving both Eddie and Venom for the past conflicts. He with the symbiote got a new costume design and they were overpowering Osborn until Norman mortally injured Flash Thompson. This caused Spider-Man and the symbiote to get angry, eventually losing control until Flash calmed them down with his dying breath. In the final battle, Spider-Man tells the symbiote to leave him and that he himself is going to be all right while Norman also detaches himself from Carnage.

Eddie Brock

David Michelinie would later write the backstory of Eddie Brock as the alien's new host that would become the villain Venom, using the events of Peter David's 1985 "Sin Eater" storyline in The Spectacular Spider-Man as a basis for Brock's origin. Venom's existence was first indicated in Web of Spider-Man #18 (September 1986), when he shoved Peter Parker in front of a subway train without Parker's spider-sense warning him, though only Brock's hand was seen on-panel. The next indication of Venom's existence was in Web of Spider-Man #24 (March 1987), when Parker climbed out of a high story window to change into Spider-Man, but found a black arm coming through the window and grabbing him, again without being warned by his spider-sense. After appearing in shadow in The Amazing Spider-Man #298 (March 1988), Venom made his cameo appearance on the last page of The Amazing Spider-Man #299 (April 1988), when he terrorized Parker's wife, Mary Jane Watson, and made his full appearance in The Amazing Spider-Man #300 (May 1988).

Spider-Man confronted him in the following issue, when Brock reveals that he was a Daily Globe reporter who worked on the Sin-Eater case, and that his career was ruined when it was discovered that the man Brock announced as the Sin-Eater was a compulsive confessor. Forced to eke out a living writing lurid stories for venomous tabloids, Brock blamed Spider-Man for his predicament. He took up bodybuilding to reduce stress. It failed to do so, and Brock sank into a suicidal depression. Seeking solace at the church where Spider-Man repelled the symbiote, the symbiote—sensing Brock's hatred for Spider-Man—bonded with the disgraced reporter. Brock took on the name Venom in reference to the sensationalistic material he was forced to traffic in following his fall from grace.

Over the years, as the symbiote gained more intelligence and moved to additional human hosts, the name began to apply to the symbiote as well as its hosts. As Venom, Brock fights Spider-Man many times, winning on several occasions. Venom repeatedly tries to kill Peter Parker/Spider-Man—both when the latter was in and out of costume. Thus Parker is forced to abandon his "black costume", which the symbiote had been mimicking, after Venom confronts Parker's wife Mary Jane.

Venom escapes from the supervillain prison, The Vault, to torment Spider-Man and his family. The symbiote is finally rendered comatose after being subdued by Styx's plague virus, and Eddie Brock is subsequently placed in Ryker's Island Prison. When the symbiote recovers and returns to free Brock, it leaves a spawn to bond with Brock's psychotic serial-killer cellmate Cletus Kasady, who becomes Carnage. Meanwhile, Venom and Spider-Man fight on a deserted island, and Spider-Man strands Venom there after faking his own death. Soon after, however, Spider-Man brings Venom back to New York City to stop Carnage's killing spree. After being incarcerated once again, Venom is used to create five new symbiotes, which are all paired with human hosts.

As well as helping Eddie Brock to seek continued revenge against Spider-Man, the symbiote also aids Brock in a sporadic career as a vigilante. He and the symbiote occasionally share a desire to protect innocent people from harm, even if it means working side by side with the hated Spider-Man. This is especially true when Venom combats the entity he believes to be his spawn, Carnage. When Spider-Man helps Venom save Brock's ex-wife Anne Weying, the two form a temporary truce, though this falls apart after Weying's suicide.

The symbiote is temporarily stolen by U.S. Senator Steward Ward, who hopes to better understand his own alien infection by researching the symbiote before it returns to Brock. Now, however, it dominates its host, Brock, rather than vice versa. Eventually, Eddie Brock and the symbiote go their separate ways as the symbiote grows tired of having a diseased host and Eddie rejects its growing bloodlust, leading him to sell the symbiote at a super villain auction.

The creature that would become Venom was born in the 998th generation to a race of extraterrestrial symbiotes, which lived by possessing the bodies of other life-forms. The parasites would endow their victims with enhanced physical abilities, at the cost of fatally draining them of adrenaline. According to the 1995 "Planet of the symbiotes" storyline, the Venom symbiote, after separated from its first host, was deemed insane by its own race after it was discovered that it desired to commit to its host rather than use it up. The symbiote was then imprisoned on Battleworld to ensure it did not pollute the species' gene pool.

The symbiote bonds with its new host, Lee Price, launching volume 3 of the Venom comic book series. The series ran for six issues total (Nov. 2016 – April 2017). Eddie Brock is able to regain the Venom symbiote at the conclusion of the series, returning the Venom comic book title to volume 1 with issue #150.

Scorpion (Mac Gargan)

The Venom symbiote approached Mac Gargan, the villain formerly known as Scorpion, and offered him new abilities as the second Venom. Gargan bonded with the creature, which would later give him an extra edge as part of Norman Osborn's Sinister Twelve. As the Avengers dealt with the rest of the Twelve, Spider-Man swiftly defeated Gargan, even with these additional powers, which Spider-Man suggests is attributed to the fact that Mac Gargan does not hate Spider-Man as much as Eddie Brock did.

Gargan later became a member of a sub-group of the Thunderbolts, which was drafted by the Avengers to hunt down the members of the fugitive New Avengers. It was then revealed that he had been outfitted with electrical implants by the government to keep the symbiote in check.

When in the Venom persona, Gargan retained very little of his original personality and was controlled almost completely by the symbiote, which drove him to cannibalism. When the symbiote was dormant in his body, he expressed nausea and fear of the organism. During a fight with "Anti-Venom" (Eddie Brock), he and his symbiote were separated, and the Venom symbiote was nearly destroyed. Blobs of it still existed in his bloodstream, however, so Osborn injected Gargan with a vaccine for Anti-Venom's healing powers, which restored the symbiote by causing the remaining pieces of it to expand rapidly. Gargan dons a Scorpion battle armor over the symbiote while it heals, causing him to become what Spider-Man calls "Ven-orpion" although when the symbiote is fully restored it shatters the armor.

After ingesting a chemical given to him by Norman Osborn, Venom transforms into a more human appearance similar to the Black-Suited Spider-Man. Osborn introduces him as The Amazing Spider-Man, a member of the Dark Avengers, while unveiling the team. After the Siege of Asgard, Gargan and most of the Dark Avengers were taken into custody. While being held on the Raft, the Venom symbiote was forcefully removed from him, ending his run as Venom.

Flash Thompson

On December 9, 2010, Marvel Comics announced a new "black ops" Venom owned by the government. This new Venom was featured in a new series called Venom in March 2011. The birth of the new Venom can be seen in The Amazing Spider-Man #654 in February 2011. On January 28, 2011, the identity of "black ops" Venom was revealed to be Flash Thompson. Flash is hired by the government to be a special agent wearing the Venom symbiote as part of Project Rebirth. Flash is only allowed to wear the suit for up to 48 hours, or risk a permanent bonding with the symbiote. Along with the alien, Flash is equipped with a "Multi-Gun" designed to change into any type of gun Flash needs. The Government is also equipped with a "kill switch" designed to take Flash out if he loses control. Flash rejects the kill switch and later joins the Secret Avengers, Thunderbolts, Guardians of the Galaxy, and even becomes appointed by the Klyntar a Space Knight.

Lee Price
Lee Price first appeared in Venom vol. 3 #1.
After being separated from Flash Thompson through unspecified means, the Venom symbiote happens upon a black market deal between Black Cat's gang and Tombstone's gang. He resorts to bonding with one of the men present, a discharged Army Ranger named Lee Price who was with Scorpion as part of Black Cat's gang. The weakened symbiote pleads with Price, attempting to convince him to become a hero like Thompson. Price ignores and overpowers it, intent on using it for personal gain as a new, wholly villainous Venom.

Lee Price makes his way to Black Cat's hideout where Scorpion accuses him of botching the black market sale by causing the shoot-out. After having to keep the Venom symbiote from attacking Black Cat, Lee Price takes his leave from Black Cat's lair as Scorpion gets suspicious towards Lee. His departure is seen by some FBI Agents. Lee Price later gets attacked by Tombstone's minion Firebug. Upon defeating Firebug, an FBI Agent with a bazooka appears telling Lee Price that he is under arrest.

Lee Price eventually loses the symbiote when Eddie Brock and Spider-Man take him down and he is arrested by the NYPD.

While incarcerated at the New York Corrections Supermax Facility for Superhuman Incarceration, Lee Price is feared by most of the inmates and he even defeats three inmates in the prison's cafeteria when they try to kill him to boost their reputation. Lee swears to get out, reclaim the Venom symbiote, and plan revenge on those who have wronged him. Lee Price is later visited by his lawyer who tells him that two of the inmates he defeated had died in the infirmary and that Venom has resurfaced upon it being revealed in the news. At the courthouse, Lee Price's lawyer stated that Lee's actions as Venom were caused by the Venom symbiote while the opposing lawyer mentions about Venom still being at large. The judge then asked for some evidence to help with the trial. After the trial, Lee Price is released from prison and begins his plans to reclaim the Venom symbiote and take revenge on those who have wronged him.

In Venom Inc., Lee Price steals the Mania symbiote from Andy and becomes Maniac. He uses the symbiote to infect the crime bosses and become a criminal kingpin, but he is defeated by Spider-Man, Venom, Black Cat and Agent Anti-Venom.

When Cletus Kasady was collecting the codex left in the bodies of previous hosts, he disguised himself as Eddie and went to jail where he killed Lee after ripping the Maniac symbiote off him, while framing Eddie for the murder.

Tel-Kar
Tel-Kar first appeared in Venom: First Host #1.
During the Kree-Skrull War, the Kree, desiring to replicate the Skrull's shape-shifting abilities, they obtain the newborn Venom, which had been outcast from the other symbiotes, on Gorr's planet where Knull had created the symbiotes. Tel-Kar is recruited to be bonded to the newborn symbiote to infiltrate the Skrull army. Tel-Kar's body is biologically altered so he can have full control over the symbiote's mind to the point of erasing its memories. He successfully infiltrated the Skrull army discovering various secrets. However he blew his cover up to save some Kree refugees and handed the symbiote to them to return it to Hala. Then Tel-Kar was betrayed by Ronan the Accuser who used a Kree Sentry to capture Tel-Kar and was given to the Skrulls as a war criminal. Separated from Tel-Kar after his capture, the symbiote goes on to be bonded to Spider-Man.

Tel-Kar escapes the Skrulls and wanders through the Galaxy thinking that the War is still going on, until he hears of an agent from Earth called Flash Thompson with a black symbiote suit. Recognizing it as his symbiote, he goes to Earth to find it. Eddie Brock arrives with the symbiote and saves Tel-Kar from the Warbride Skrull M'Lanz, who had followed him. Angered by Venom's refusal to return to him, Tel-Kar threatens to bond to Venom's latest offspring and turn it into a monster. Acceding to Tel-Kar, Venom reunites with him and they go to a Skrull research base to get a Skrull bioweapon. Simultaneously, Eddie is bonded to the offspring calling itself Sleeper and allies with M'Lanz to stop Tel-Kar. During the ensuing battle, Tel-Kar concludes that he does not need Venom anymore and uses an electrified spear to detach himself from it while scarring himself in the process. Later he is betrayed by the Kree Empire while Eddie escapes with Venom and M'Lanz with Sleeper. Tel-Kar, now furious, attempts to release the bioweapon on Earth to kill all humanity, but Sleeper bonds to Tel-Kar and lobotomizes him as punishment for what he did to Venom and Eddie. Sleeper, now with Tel-Kar's body, wishes Eddie farewell and goes on to explore the universe.

Malekith 

During the War of the Realms event, after Venom was separated from Eddie, the symbiote, in its humanoid form, joined the War Avengers (composed of Captain Marvel, Deadpool, Sif, Winter Soldier, Weapon H, Black Widow, and Captain Britain) to fight off Malekith's invasion. However, upon fighting Malekith, the Dark Elf with the use of the Ebony Blade, teleported away along with Venom. Since Malekith was aware of Knull and Gorr's All-Black the Necrosword, he tortured the symbiote and turned it into his own weapon similar to All-Black to use it against the Asgardians. During the end of the event, Malekith enhanced the symbiote with his dark magic and bonded the symbiote to his various acolytes, turning them into the Spider-Elves. After the Thor Corps arrived, which consisted of Thor, King Thor, Young Odinson and Jane Foster, Malekith using the Venom Blade/Symbio Sword, covered one of Thor's hammers with the symbiote and declared himself the Butcher of Thor. However, he was defeated and the symbiote was ultimately free from Malekith's control.

Other hosts
Aside from the aforementioned hosts, there have been other, shorter term hosts for the Venom symbiote.

Scarlet Spider (Ben Reilly) 

In the Planet of the Symbiotes storyline, the symbiote was rejected by Eddie, causing it to release a powerful scream that attracts the other symbiotes to Earth. Subsequently, the symbiote sees Scarlet Spider, (Ben Reilly) and takes the form of his hooded top attempting to bond to Ben mistaking him for Spider-Man but failed owing to Ben's strong will. When it was later discovered by Brock and Peter Parker, the symbiote returned to Eddie.

Anne Weying 

Anne Weying first appears in The Amazing Spider-Man #375. She is Eddie Brock's ex-wife and a successful lawyer. Weying assists Spider-Man by sharing some of Brock's history. Later, she follows Spider-Man to the amusement park where Venom had Peter's (fake) parents. She confronts Brock and manages to convince him to end his feud. After Sin-Eater shoots Ann as part of a crusade against social injustice, Ann becomes She-Venom when the Venom symbiote temporarily bonds with her to save her life. She-Venom lashes out against the men who had hurt her, and Brock becomes afraid for her (and of her) and compels the symbiote to return to him. Ann is left distraught at her actions while bonded. Later Ann is arrested on a false charge as part of a trap for Venom. She manages to warn Brock who sends the symbiote to her, allowing her to become She-Venom and escape custody. Some time later, Ann, traumatized by her experiences with Venom and the symbiote, commits suicide after seeing Spider-Man pass by her window in a black costume, believing it is Brock returning for her.

Patricia Robertson

The story follows U.S. Army communication specialist Patricia Robertson. During a supply run to an Ararat Corporation owned outpost she discovers everyone at the installation dead except for one scientist. It is revealed that the Ararat Corporation is run by an alien colony of miniature spider robots led by an entity named Bob, that have infiltrated the American government. The Ararat Corporation has cloned Venom to facilitate the extermination of humanity, but the clone ravages its hosts. The clone is responsible for the death of the outpost crew.

Robertson finds an ally in the Suit, a mysterious individual made of the same miniature robots as Bob, revealed to have been accidentally brought to Earth by Reed Richards. The Suit modifies Robertson while she is unconscious to allow her to control the clone if it bonds with her. The Suit sabotages Wolverine, the clones favored host, forcing it to bond with Robertson. One of Bob's agents convinces Robertston to kill the real Venom to save humanity, causing her to free the incarcerated Venom. She and Venom fight, but Venom escapes. Bob remotely deactivates the technology allowing Robertson to control the clone forcing her to rely on willpower. Later, Robertson and Venom again fight, and Venom absorbs the clone. Venom decides to carry out the clone's mission given to it by the Ararat corporation. The series did not continue and the plot remained unresolved as of 2012. The Venom symbiote would later regurgitate and expel the clone from its body, allowing it to bond with a teenager named Andrea "Andi" Benton. Taking the name Mania, Benton became Agent Venom's partner for a time.

Angelo Fortunato
Angelo Fortunato first appeared in Marvel Knights Spider-Man #7 and was killed in issue #8. Angelo is the son of Don Fortunato, a prominent Mafia capo. His frail physique and shy attitude leave Angelo frequently bullied and humiliated by his father. Don attends a supervillain auction and purchases the Venom symbiote from Brock for $100 million. Brock warns Angelo of the symbiote, but Angelo rebuffs him, saying that he has nothing to lose. After bonding with the symbiote, Angelo discovers the secret identity of Spider-Man, and attempts to kill him to prove his worth. Spider-Man ultimately defeats Angelo and when he tries to escape, the symbiote abandons Angelo for his cowardice while he is leaping between buildings, leaving him to fall to his death. Spider-Man tried to save him, but he ran out of webs.

Kulan Gath 
In the 2008 Spider-Man / Red Sonja miniseries, where Spider-Man and Red Sonja, possessing the body of Mary Jane, fought the evil wizard Kulan Gath, who had possessed a U.S. senator, Kulan detached the symbiote from Eddie and bonded to it, becoming Kulan Venom. Luckily, the symbiote returned to Eddie, following the defeat of Kulan.

Ms. Marvel (Carol Danvers)
During the Siege, Mac Gargan with the symbiote was fighting Spider-Man and Ms. Marvel. When they separated Mac from Venom, the symbiote briefly bonded to Carol and started flying away. But Carol gathered her powers and detached from the symbiote which rebonded to Mac.

Red Hulk (Thunderbolt Ross) 
During the Circle of Four storyline, when Red Hulk came crashing into Flash's apartment so he can recruit him, the symbiote sensing Red Hulk as a danger, briefly bonds to him so he does not do any harm to Flash. Then when Red Hulk calms down, the symbiote returns to Flash. During the fight against Blackheart, Hulk bonded again with the symbiote along with Zarathos to prevent Hell from coming to Earth.

Superior Spider-Man (Otto Octavius)

When Flash Thompson with the symbiote was infiltrating into the Crime Master's men, Superior Spider-Man came attacking the criminals who was then confronted by Agent Venom. Doc Ock, thinking that Venom was still evil, attacked Flash with Web Shooters filled with burner fuel and in the process injured Flash. While Flash was recovering, Superior Spider-Man put the symbiote in a canister and gave Flash a pair of prosthetic legs. Then the symbiote broke out and, instead of bonding to Flash, bonded to Superior Spider-Man, as it was still connected to Peter's body. After bonding to the symbiote, Otto called himself the Superior Venom and went solving crime in a much more brutal way. Then Mary Jane called the Avengers to stop the Superior Venom. But the Avengers proved to be no match to Superior Venom since he had the abilities of Spider-Man, powered by Venom, with the mind of Doctor Octopus. In the fight Otto realizes that the symbiote was messing with his head and with the help of Peter's consciousness and Flash's (who had arrived in an Iron Man suit) he separated himself from Venom which returned to Flash.

Groot, Rocket Racoon and Drax
When Flash was part of the Guardians of the Galaxy he got separated from the symbiote and his teammates decided to send him to Earth. While traveling, Groot accidentally bonds to the symbiote and started attacking the others. Rocket tried to save his friend, but the symbiote left Groot and bonded to him. He then tried to convince them to leave the ship, but Drax grabbed Rocket by the tail and started bashing him against the wall until the symbiote bonded to Drax and defeated the whole team. The symbiote possessed Drax took control of the ship and went to a planet formed from symbiotes named Klyntar (later revealed to be Knull's cage) where the symbiote was purified and bonded to Flash.

Mercurio the 4-D Man 

Agent Venom as Venom Space Knight foils the Gramosian's attempts to steal resources from the home planets of the P'qui and the Wugin, and to acquire chemical weapons derived from the blood of kidnapped Vvexians.

Mercurio forces a Ruu'lto named Pik Rollo, whose child he is holding hostage, to try and assassinate Agent Venom, but Rollo instead betrays Mercurio, and joins forces with Venom. When the two lay siege to Mercurio's headquarters, he incapacitates and imprisons them, and separates the Venom symbiote from Flash Thompson. Sensing the symbiote's suppressed bloodlust, Mercurio attempts to convince it to join him, but it instead frees and returns to Thompson. The reformed Agent Venom and his allies proceed to dismantle Mercurio's forces, but Mercurio himself escapes, and swears vengeance on both the symbiote and Thompson.

A bout of temporary insanity that the Venom symbiote subsequently experiences is eventually discerned to have been caused by its brief fusion with Mercurio, whose evil had undone the mental "cleansing" that the creature had earlier undergone.

Mysterio (Quentin Beck)

In the mini-series Symbiote Spider-Man (set during the period when Spider-Man was still bonded to the symbiote), Mysterio blackmailed Black Cat into stealing a piece of Spider-Man's suit for him. When he had his friend, Jonathan Ohnn, a scientist working for the Kingpin, examine the piece, the symbiote controlling Peter's body came to retrieve it, however, after clashing with the Kingpin's men, was unable to find it and fled. The severed piece of symbiote bonded to Mysterio, allowing him to escape from the Kingpin's interrogation. He then went after Spider-Man to steal the suit and use it for himself.

Powers and abilities

Though it requires a living host to survive, the Venom symbiote is adept at fending for itself independent of a host. The symbiote is capable of shapeshifting abilities, including the ability to form spikes or expand its size, as well as mimic the appearance of other humanoids after it has obtained a host. The organism can additionally use its shape-shifting abilities to conceal itself by altering its coloration or by becoming completely invisible. It also contains a small "dimensional aperture", allowing its hosts to carry items without adding mass to the costume. The symbiote also exhibits telepathic abilities, primarily when it needs to communicate with its host.

Because of its contact with Spider-Man, the symbiote grants all of its subsequent hosts that hero's powers and cannot be detected by his spider-sense. As Spider-Man's fighting style is partly dependent on his spider-sense, his effectiveness was somewhat hampered when he battled Eddie Brock. Retaining its memory from the time it was bonded with Spider-Man, Venom is also capable of producing webbing similar to Spider-Man's variety created from its biomass.

The symbiote greatly enhances the physical strength of those it bonds with. Its hosts experience a vastly larger size and musculature. The symbiote displays non-human teeth, which are very sharp, and commonly protrude a long, prehensile tongue from its mouth. Venom is depicted as being physically much bigger than Spider-Man, as well as having more brute strength.

Venom exhibits some immunities to the supernatural powers of others such as the Penance Stare of Ghost Rider or Spider-Man's extrasensory spider-sense.

Some incarnations of the Venom symbiote have shown it able to replicate itself. This ability is shown in the 2005–2006 miniseries Spider-Man: Reign when Venom recreates his symbiote to combat his loneliness.

The Venom symbiote is vulnerable to fire and sonic waves, causing it great pain and exhaustion if it sustains enough exposure. It can sense and track all of its offspring symbiotes except Carnage, who learned how to block this ability shortly after bonding with Cletus Kasady and confronting Venom/Eddie Brock for the first time.

The Venom symbiote is shown to form giant web-like dragon wings when it was in contact with Knull.

Other versions

Prime Earth (Earth-616)
Earth-616 is the mainstream Marvel Comics continuity. While the Venom symbiote has had numerous hosts in this reality, there have also been several alternate versions of the character, who are not the same as the original symbiote.

Venomized Galactus 
In Web of Spider-Man #90, when Spider-Man was fighting Mysterio, Mysterio created an illusion of Galactus bonded to the Venom symbiote to mess with Spider-Man's mind.

Exomorph Rhino 
Mattie Franklin encounters an Exomorph with the powers and amalgamated appearance of Venom, Doctor Octopus and Rhino.

Venom symbiote virus 
When Doctor Doom got the sample of the Venom symbiote, he created a virus-like symbiote bio-weapon or Venom Bomb. The virus was accidentally unleashed upon New York, and bonded to various New Yorkers and heroes including: Spider-Man, Spider-Woman (Veranke), Wasp, Black Widow, Wolverine, Doctor Strange and Hawkeye. Iron Man eventually finds a cure and frees everyone from the symbiotes.

Sinister Six Super-Skrull 
A Super-Skrull with the powers of the Lizard, Rhino, Electro, Hydro-Man, Sandman, and Venom appears in Secret Invasion attacking the Daily Bugle. He was later defeated by Jackpot.

Spider-Man's second symbiote 
When Spider-Man with his class from Jean Grey's school went to S.W.O.R.D. satellite station, the satellite was attacked by a swarm of Broods bonded to symbiotes. To stop the symbiote infected Broods, Spider-Man bonded to one of the symbiotes with the help of No-Girl to keep the symbiote from taking over. The symbiote was eventually ejected into space.

Spider-Man's third symbiote 
During the Venomized storyline, where the Poisons tried to invade with the kidnapped symbiotes which have been modified to be undetachable from the hosts. Spider-Man along with the other Heroes got forcibly bonded to the symbiotes by the Poisons and after the defeat of the Poison Queen, Alchemax employer Professor Steve helps remove the symbiotes from the heroes and are returned to Klyntar.

Magic Venom 
After Eddie Brock was separated from Venom, Eddie and his son Dylan find themselves in the middle of Malekith's invasion. Dark Elves are on every street corner, attacking everyone they can get their hands on. But even without a suit, Eddie cannot let innocent people fall prey to the Dark Elves. With nothing but his fists, he challenges Malekith's forces. Obviously, his efforts, raw strength and heroism is enough to attract the attention of one of Malekith's War Witches, who approaches Eddie with a dangerous gift, a Dreamstone, which brings life to dreams and desires. Seeing a golden opportunity to become a weapon and lethal protector once more, Eddie takes the stone, which grants him his wish. He creates an artificial symbiote similar to Venom, but much taller and thinner, almost ghoulish-looking with spikes that cover large portions of his body and razor-sharp claws. Eddie also realizes that this murderous creature has no mind of its own.

100th Anniversary Special Spider-Man
In the alternate universe of Earth-TRN421, in the year 2061, after Wilson Fisk killed Eddie Brock in a confrontation, he got the symbiote and modified it giving it the ability to travel through technology. Then Kingpin after being bonded to the symbiote, started chasing Peter so he could finally kill Spider-Man once and for all. In the end Peter directed Kingpin in the woods and in an intense battle Peter used his torch to separate Kingpin from Venom and after that he burned the symbiote for good.

A-Babies vs. X-Babies
A toddler version of Eddie Brock as Venom was a member of the Brotherhood of Evil Mutants.

Apocalypse Wars
In the Extraordinary X-Men crossover Apocalypse Wars, Venom is one of the Horsemen of Apocalypse. He briefly absorbs Old Man Logan, until Jean Grey expels him.

Circle of Four
In this alternate take of the Circle of Four storyline, the symbiote was physically and mentally bonded to Flash, becoming a human/symbiote hybrid. After Captain America offered Flash a place in the Avengers, Spider-Man gave up his superhero identity giving it Flash, who became the new Spider-Man and rekindled his relationship with Betty Brant. However, the Green Goblin found out about Flash's identity and murdered Betty, making Venom to swear to kill Green Goblin.

Contest of Champions
An alternate version of Eddie Brock appears as Venom in the 2015 Contest of Champions miniseries as one of the Grandmaster's champions. This version killed his version of Spider-Man and wears his costume as a cape, though Eddie is often haunted by Peter Parker's voice in his head. He is eventually killed by Punisher 2099 with a disintegration gun in the same place where the Sentry and Stick were seemingly killed. The symbiote fuses with the Sentry and Void's remains and turned into some Void/symbiote hybrids named Symbioids. When Stick reveals his survival, he merges their energies to resurrect the Sentry.

Dark Avengers
The Venom symbiote of this reality had been captured and was kept in a test tube in one of Iron Man's labs. Dr. Hank Pym had experimented on the symbiote to find a way to adapt it for use to outfit Stark's new armors with, however these experiments had destroyed what conscious it had left but it was still able to retain its biological properties of replacing missing limbs. During the period where Stark held the Dark Avengers, June Covington telepathically manipulated Pym into helping her restore her teammates to fight. They took the symbiote and used it to replace John Walker's missing arm and leg allowing him to become U.S.Agent once again.

Dark Reign: Fantastic Four
In Dark Reign: Fantastic Four, everyone is transported in a reality where Reed Richards had become the Supreme Intelligence. In this reality, the Venom symbiote had multiplied and had bonded to an entire regime of Skrulls, who had been killing various Reeds, Johnnys and Bens, but not Susans.

Deadpool Kills The Marvel Universe Again
When Deadpool's mind got brainwashed, he killed Eddie Brock and wore the symbiote. He thought that he, alongside Spider-Man were eating together to win a pie eating competition against the Blob, where in reality he was using the symbiote to eat Spider-Man. The Venom symbiote then leaves Deadpool since he got his revenge on Spider-Man.

Earth-617 
In the alternate reality of Earth-617, Gwen Stacy encountered Spider-Gwen, leading her to avoid her death. Following the example of Spider-Gwen, she became an excellent detective and after bonding to this universe's Venom, they became Spider-Woman.

Earth X 
In the alternative future of the Earth X limited series, after Peter forcibly removed the symbiote from himself, the symbiote wanted to get revenge on Peter by turning his daughter against him, after leaving Eddie Brock. This backfire as May "Mayday" Parker was able to fully control and communicate with the symbiote. Mayday with the symbiote became a crime fighter heroine much to Peter's dismay. When the Skull tried to overtake the US, May tried to fight, but she instead fell under Skull's mind control. Peter eventually returned as Spider-Man to save his daughter. Then she helps her father to fight the villainous Spiders Man who had trapped Peter in web of illusions. She is later recruited by Kang the Conqueror as part of a scheme against the Apocalypse Twins and the Avengers Unity Squad. She then reappeared during the "Spider-Verse" event.

House of M
In House of M an actor portrays Venom.

MC2 
In Spider-Girl, the Venom symbiote was separated from Eddie Brock and remained trapped in containment for more than a decade. After being free, attempts to re-bond with Peter Parker to become Spider-Venom and makes him to kill his own family, but gets separated by Spider-Girl and Phil Urich as the heroic Green Goblin. Then is forcefully bonded to Spider-Girl's friend Normie Osborn III, the grandson of the original Green Goblin, by Goblin Queen. It takes control of Normie, but when it also attempts to absorb Spider-Girl, their combined force of will defeats the creature. Instead of destroying it, Normie keeps the symbiote and allows it to bond with him, purging the symbiote of its violent and aggressive emotions. When Normie is in control he resembles as Spider-Man's classic black suit with four additional arms resembling Six-armed Spider-Man and briefly calling themselves Dusk, since Venom was the name between Eddie Brock and the symbiote. He then joins Kaine's team of reformed villains. In Spider-Girl #100, Normie transfers the symbiote to a critically injured Spider-Girl so it can heal and save her. The symbiote later sacrifices itself to save Spider-Girl's life by confronting a sonic weapon-armed Hobgoblin. The Venom symbiote removed all of Normie's tattoos and scars from his suicides attempts as it died, as a parting gift. Then Normie confirms that the symbiote is dead.

Mayhem (April Parker)

Publication history 
Mayhem first appeared in Amazing Spider-Girl #20 and subsequently appeared in Spectacular Spider-Girl, with her final appearance being in Spider-Girl: The End.

Fictional character biography 
It is revealed that, while still bonded to Eddie Brock, some of the symbiote's genetic material had been taken by Norman Osborn and combined with a clone of May to make a Human/Symbiote hybrid. She was discovered by Normie Osborn, who revealed to Peter Parker that the clone may be the original Mayday Parker, as Norman had written letters hinting to this fact. After a failed attempt to get the answers from Élan DeJunae, Normie was attacked by the hybrid who managed to escape. She then stalks the original May to her school to replace her, starting the Clone Saga. She accidentally threw herself down the school stairwell, allowing the familiar May to escape by leaping off the building. May changed into Spider-Girl, but New May on her way to assist the X-People in containing Sara Hingle's powers. The hybrid intercepted May on her way and tried to tackle her. May saved them both from falling to the street, and, after a brief fight May saved her double again and, proving a major difference between the two Mays as Spider-Girl does not kill her enemies, but the hybrid was more ruthless. When arguing about who the real May, Kaine comments "Are you saying clones aren't real?"

After being "absorbed" into the aged Peter Parker, the original Green Goblin—Norman Osborn takes over Peter's mind, but, in an attempt to become invincible, Osborn combines himself with the Hybrid, Spider-Man, and accidentally Spider-Girl, when she dives in to save her father. After Osborn makes Spider-Man view his worst moments, Spider-Girl's memory overrides Osborn's power, and she was able to convince the Hybrid to fight Osborn together, and so force everyone out of Peter's body; destroying Osborn in the process.

After that, May proposed to the hybrid to join the Parker Family as May always wanted to have a sister, despite Peter being against the idea. The hybrid named herself "April Parker" and went on to live with the real Spider-Girl's family (her baby brother, Mary Jane, and Peter) and starts to go school where she befriends May's friends especially Gene Thompson, Flash Thompson's son. She becomes a partner to Spider-Girl and helps her fight crime and even saves Peter from the Goblin Queen with the help of Phil Urich.

Despite trying to a hero, she was more ruthless than May as seen when she killed Hobgoblin, Tombstone and nearly killing Black Tarantula, due for being hired to do so.

In a later timeline, Mayhem feeling jealousy towards May, she tries to make her accept that she was the clone and start fighting, however she accidentally kills the real Spider-Girl. Feeling guilty for what she has done she impersonates May and became a murderous vigilante, eventually killing the hero American Dream. In an attempt to stop her, the military used pieces of the dead Carnage symbiote to create the Bio-Predators. However the Biopreds take over their hosts and start killing and bonding to thousands of humans around the world, decimating the world and its defenders. Mayhem, seeing the error of her ways, with the help of Cassie Lang goes back in time using Doctor Doom's time machine. However, she materialized inside a wall. She implanted her memories into her younger self, before dying and the present April sacrifices herself to save Spider-Girl, ensuring the events that led to the Biopreds' creation never occurred. She is presumed dead, but Peter assures May that clones always come back.

Powers and abilities 

Due to being a Symbiote/Human hybrid and clone of Mayday Parker, she has all the powers of her predecessors, Venom and Spider-Girl. However, due to her half-symbiote nature, she is also immune to the symbiotes' classic weaknesses.

Other versions 
In a reality imagined by Phil Urich where Spider-Girl did not exist, the Venom symbiote fully bonded to Peter, permanently becoming Spider-Venom. This versions would later appear along with the Spider-Army during Spider-Verse.

Mangaverse 
In the Marvel Mangaverse continuity, Venom is a normal man, the son of May and her first husband, Shinji, and a former member of the Spider-Clan. Venom's skin is black due to the poisoned arrows throwed by the Shadow-Clan, which killed his father. His spider symbol is white, and also much larger than Spider-Man's.

Venom is responsible for the murder of most of Spider-Clan and Peter's Uncle Ben, Venom's stepfather in the Mangaverse, at the command of New York's Kingpin of Crime. Peter defeats him and spares his life. Venom later usurps Kingpin for control over New York's ninja criminal gangs.

Separately, the Venom symbiote appears as a black liquid that is released from a cursed amulet, which was given to Peter by Black Cat. The symbiote draws energy from the amulet's wearer, which can be fatal after prolonged exposure. The wearer's strength and agility are increased, and his or her ability to control their own violent urges is reduced. When Peter Parker becomes possessed by the evil amulet, removing it leaves him near death.

Venom captures the amulet and chooses to sacrifice his own life to force it to save Peter, repaying the debt he owes for Peter sparing his life. This act revitalizes Peter, but leaves Venom nothing but a skeleton. The amulet, containing Venom's life force, is used to heal the crippled Kingpin.

In the Legend of the Spider-Clan one-shot story Elemental Evil, Venom inexplicably reappears in the mountain-top home of the Spider-Clan, alive and whole, his skin now a dark blue. He also gained new powers, including a pair of vicious jaws and a long drooling tongue, bringing him closer in appearance to his Earth-616 counterpart. Despite their history, Peter agrees that Venom will teach the ways of the Spider-Clan and the use of his powers to Peter. Venom and the rest of the new Spider-Clan aid in training Peter to become more powerful, tapping into the mystical side of his spider abilities. In the end, Peter discovers that the group is run by Peter's biological mother, who ordered the death of Aunt May to rid him of emotional attachments. As a result, Peter refuses to take his place as leader, rejecting the clan. Venom is awarded with rulership over the Spider-Clan. No reason is given for Venom's resurrection or his new powers, but when asked about it, Venom only said "I was lucky".

During the "Spider-Verse" event, Venom becomes aware about conflict between various Spider-Man and the Inheritors and fearing that the presence of Peter in the temple will attract the conflict to the clan, he tries to stop Peter and willing to kill him, but only to be stopped by the Spider-Army.

Other versions 
An alternate version of Venom appears in Spider-Man Family Featuring Spider-Clan #1, where he and Peter's mother Kiri are the leaders of the Spider-Clan, which consist of Sandman/Earth, Jack O'Lantern/Fire, a female Hydro-Man/Water, an old man version of Cyclone/Wind, Green Goblin, Hobgoblin, Kraven, Rhino, Scorpion and Vulture.

Marvel 2099 

Kron Stone is the older half-brother of Spider-Man 2099 (Miguel O'Hara), having the same father: Tyler Stone. As a child, Kron was continually abused by the android housekeeper which mistook him for a dog, and as a result he later became a bully, taking enjoyment in other people's pain. The relationship between the two brothers is so conflicted that Miguel tried to kill Kron at one point. In his introduction, Stone ordered Jake Gallows' family to be killed. Gallows found Stone and fatally wounded him with a knife as revenge, before dumping his body into the sewer. As Kron laid dying in the sewer, his body brushed up against a black ball. The ball then bonded to him and formed a new Venom. The symbiote was described as having mutated over the years, and displayed new abilities in this timeline, including acidic blood and saliva. With this new power, Stone sought to emotionally torture Miguel—whom Kron never discovered was his half-brother—by hurting those close to him, going so far as to kill Miguel's former love Dana—who was also Tyler's lover. After a fight between Spider-Man and Venom, the former emerged as the victor, using loud speakers to neutralize Venom, who was subsequently taken to the lab for study. It was revealed that the symbiote bonded with Kron on a molecular level, giving Kron an amorphous physiology that allowed his body to take on the properties of the symbiote itself.

Later, after the symbiote was separated from Kron, it merged with Roman the Sub-Mariner, the son of Namor, who fled to the ocean and is never seen again. It was later shown that part of the symbiote is at the Alchemax lab for studying.

A new Venom 2009, Alea Bell, was introduced in a similarly named one-shot published in 2019. When she was a child, her left arm was badly burned in a crash that also resulted in the death of her mother. Raised by her father, Theo, Alea was bullied at school over her scars. She was then selected to undergo an experimental treatment being developed by Alchemax scientist Dr. Russell. She regained consciousness to find that the treatment had worked and her arm was restored. During a confrontation the next day with a girl at school, a black tendril emerged from her hand and sliced through the Alchemax monitoring bracelet. Alea heard a sinister voice in her head, her left arm transforming into a jet-black limb tipped with razor-sharp claws. Returning home, Alea learned that the purported panacea she had been treated with was a piece of a symbiote called Venom, and that Alchemax intended to turn her into a supersoldier using it. Empathizing with its pain, felt, Alea reluctantly agreed to the symbiote's request to be made whole in exchange for her getting her normal life back. Infiltrating Alchemax, Alea was accosted by a pair of guards and was horrified when the symbiote killed them to protect her. As the symbiote scolded her innocent naivety, Alea protested that she did not want to be seen as a monster. Arriving at the lab containing the other pieces of the symbiote, Alea shut down the containment grid, but was knocked unconscious by Dr. Russell. The Venom symbiote, reclaiming its disparate pieces, bonded to Alea, transformed her into Venom and had eaten Dr. Russell as revenge for cutting it apart. Disgusted, Alea reiterated that she did not want to become a monster and asked if they could be a hero instead; the Venom symbiote begrudgingly agreeing to her request. At school the following day, Alea transformed into Venom to terrify her bully. However, the symbiote was abruptly overcome by the will of a dark god. Alarmed, Alea asked the Venom symbiote what had happened and it told her that the god of its species, Knull, was somehow still alive and on Earth.

Other 2099 versions 
 A variant of Venom 2099 appears as a member of the Sinister Six along with another version of the Vulture and Doctor Octopus.
 Timestorm 2009–2099's version of Scorpion is Kron Stone.

Marvel Adventures
In this reality, after Reed Richards removed the symbiote from Spider-Man, Johnny Storm briefly bonded with it, believing it to be a technological suit like Spider-Man originally thought. After Johnny flamed on, the symbiote left his body in pain.

Marvel Age
In the Marvel Age mini-series Spider-Man and Power Pack #3–4, a fashion designer down on his luck manages to acquire the Venom symbiote after it is blasted off of Eddie Brock by Spider-Man, and, thinking its morphic qualities are just something built into the suit and not a living biological function, clones it three times as a new women's dress line. At the debut fashion show for the line, Peter Parker is photographing with Mary Jane Watson wearing one of the dresses, unaware of its true nature.

In the audience is the Power Pack in their civilian identities, invited by Peter as a thank you for their help in the previous two issues. When the symbiotes hear Peter's name, their genetic memory recognizes it and they turn Mary Jane and the other three models into She-Venoms, and attack. The Power Pack join Spider-Man in the battle, during which Spider-Man briefly corners the designer and gets the truth out of him about the clones. The symbiote clones are sheared from their unwilling hosts, three by a sonic boom produced by Julie Power/Lightspeed's superhuman speed, the other by an energy burst from Katie Power/Energizer. The battle is then won when Jack Power/Mass Master uses the music booth to blast them all with high audio, crippling them long enough to be captured. During the battle, however, one symbiote clone manages to briefly make contact with Katie Power's alien-born costume, causing it to become "infected" by the Venom symbiote's evil and vengeful desires (the kids' costumes in this continuity are semi-biological themselves, a concept later reinforced during a later mini-series when one is seen to repair damage to itself on its own). This causes Katie's costume to take on a Venom-like appearance, with the only differences being it is obviously smaller and Katie's energy burst symbol takes the place of the spider symbol's main body, the spider legs remaining.

The Kymellian costume-turned-symbiote completely takes control of the little girl at night, using her to team with the Sinister Six to capture Spider-Man, and then turn on the other members of Power Pack, Katie's own siblings, to take revenge on them for their part in the symbiote clones' defeat. In the final battle, Julie Power manages to find and free Spider-Man, and together they manage to get Electro to blast all the villains, including himself, with a large electrical discharge powerful enough to render them all unconscious and again shear the costume-turned-symbiote off of Katie, the discharge purging Katie's costume of the "infection" in the process, restoring it to normal.

Marvel Fairy Tales 
In Spider-Man Fairy Tales #3, Venom is a Tsuchigumo who seeks to corrupt the young priest Izumi (the Peter Parker character) by making him give into his anger.

Marvel MegaMorphs
Eddie Brock as Venom fuses with the Mega Morphs armor and tries to destroy the city, but is stopped by Iron Man and Thing.

Marvel Zombies 
In the Marvel Zombies mini-series on Earth-2149, Venom briefly appears as one of the many zombified villains. He fights the zombie Spider-Man, who quickly kills him, because the Symbiote has started to die, being unable to absorb adrenaline from Eddie Brock's zombified body. He died very early at the hands of the zombie Spider-Man himself before Zombie Spider-Man goes on. Like his Earth-616 counterpart, he has cancer and the Symbiote does not want to be with him. Unlike his Earth-616 counterpart, his disease is not cured and he is instead destroyed. Before he died, Brock managed to sputter out that he and the symbiote are dying, to which the zombie Spider-Man states that Venom is breaking his cold, dead heart.

Mini-Marvels
In Mini-Marvels, Eddie Brock as Venom is both a friend and enemy of Spider-Man. He aspires be the best newspaper dealer in the world, but the symbiote (which is made out of living ink) always ruins his chances.

Old Man Logan
In Old Man Logan, the Venom symbiote appears to be following Logan and Hawkeye, having bonded to a Savage Land tyrannosaurus rex. It is stopped by Black Bolt. Another symbiote is seen in the story and also appeared to be looking over Logan and Hawkeye on a hill. Whether this is a different piece of the Venom symbiote or another symbiote is unknown.

In the prequel, Old Man Hawkeye, the symbiote bonded to Multiple Man, increasing his cloning powers as he attempted to get revenge on Hawkeye for murdering some of his clones. When they chase Hawkeye down to a refuge town led by Kate Bishop, Clint and Kate lure the Venoms out into the wild to get devoured by the same Tyrannosaurus rex that would chase Hawkeye and Logan later on.

President Harry Osborn 
In the reality where Harry Osborn became president of U.S.A. and, because of his father, turned the government into a totalitarian regime, the Venom symbiote is bonded to the Thing, who became the head guard of the superhuman prison. At one point, the Thing battled the Resistance, who wanted to break out Doctor Doom.

Punisher vs. The Marvel Universe 
In this universe, Venom was infected by a virus which made him a cannibal. He battled Carnage and later was killed by the Punisher, to whom he tried to deliver a message from Patient Zero.

Secret Wars (2015) 
During the Secret Wars, various versions of Venom are featured:
 In 1602: Witch Hunter Angela, Edwin Brocc lives in the outskirts of York and an apprentice to the town's printer. When Angela found out he enchanted the town's beauty to marry him, he transformed into a venomous monster but was subdued in the fight.
 In Civil War, Clint Barton uses the Venom identity.
 In Spider-Island, Agent Venom (Flash Thompson) works to bring down the Spider Queen.
 In Spider-Verse, Venom works for Norman Osborn and was instructed to follow Spider-Gwen from a distance until the real Peter Parker showed himself thus taking the opportunity to capture Parker. He was defeated by Spider-Gwen after being lured to a recording studio.
 In Hail Hydra, Eddie Brock is Venom and a Hydra enforcer, leading a team of symbiote infected women, known as his Vipers.
 In Inhumans: Attilan Rising, Venom is Killiseium, battling Colossus.

Spider-Cat
In Spider-Cat's universe, Venom is a pigeon.

Spider-Geddon
In Edge of Spider-Geddon #2, in the world of Peni Parker and SP//dr, VEN#m exists as a giant mech-suit powered by a Sym Engine created to serve as back-up in case the SP//dr suit failed. It was piloted by Addy Brock until a battle against the kaiju M.O.R.B.I.U.S. caused the suit to malfunction, attain sentience, and go rogue, growing a mouth with cubic teeth and a green tongue-like wire (a reference to Evangelion). Though SP//dr was able to defeat VEN#m, she was unable to stop it from consuming Addy as well as her version of Aunt May, who flew in to fix the problem manually.

Spider-Gwen
In this reality, Dr. Elsa Brock created the Venom symbiote from the radioactive spider isotopes developed by S.I.L.K. leader Cindy Moon to cure the Lizard formula as requested by the city's Kingpin, Matt Murdock, to offer Spider-Woman a solution to losing her powers and curing the new Lizard, Harry Osborn. Gwen was forced to inject Harry with one of her spider isotopes, causing the serum inside him to mutate into Venom and attach to Wolverine before bonding to Gwen and forming Gwenom. Though Gwen succumbed to its bloodlust at first, after discovering her father was brutally beaten by the Rhino in prison, she eventually learned to control it. The symbiote in this universe despite being amorphous is actually some spiders working together being a "mutant cousin" of the alien spider that gave Gwen her powers and is not affected by classic symbiote weaknesses like sonic attacks when without a host, the symbiote is vulnerable to sonic when only bonded to a host. Spider-Gwen eventually took full control of the symbiote and turned it into a replica of her classic costume. During Spider-Geddon, the symbiote protected Spider-Gwen from Verna's touch.

 Other versions
A version of Gwenom appears along with other heroes fighting a Celestial in the second Secret Roar.

Spider-Man Adventures
In this universe which predates the Big Bang of the Earth-616 universe, the history of Eddie Brock is identical to the Eddie of Spider-Man: The Animated Series, with the difference being that instead of Dormammu and Baron Mordo bringing the Venom symbiote back to him, Eddie is reunited with the symbiote after the actions of Doctor Octopus. He along with all life of the universe are presumed dead, after the Dweller-in-Darkness use the M'Kraan Crystal to feed of energy of the dying universe.

Spider-Man Comic Strip
Eddie Brock as Venom appears in Spider-Man Comic Strip.

Spider-Man & Deadpool
In an alternate future where Spider-Man is a paralyzed old man who lives with Deadpool, Venom is bonded to Vision and is part of The Fantastic Four alongside Valeria Richards, Reed (son of the Thing) and a version of Daredevil called Lastdevil. In battle between Life Model Decoy of Deadpool Venom leaves Vision and bond to Reed to stop the LMDs, but it did not work as they get killed.

Spider-Man: India
In the final issue of the mini-series Spider-Man: India (Earth-50101), Venom appears as an exiled interdimensional demon. It is later explained, that Venom was trapped in an ancient amulet now used by tycoon Nalin Oberoi. Pavitr Prabhakar is briefly possessed by the entity, but is rejected, and the amulet sucks in Oberoi, but in the final page, Venom is the only demon left. There is also a mention of Aadi, who is this universe's Eddie Brock.

Spider-Man: Reign
In Kaare Andrews' Spider-Man: Reign, set 30 years from current comics continuity, Venom has been posing as "Edward Saks", the aide to the Mayor of New York. "Edward" has been manipulating the city ever since Spider-Man's disappearance in preparation for his eventual return; in the process, he had re-enlisted the Sinister Six, replicated his symbiote thousands of times (chalking it up to being "lonely"), and built a security system named "WEBB" which prevents New York citizens from escaping from the city, trapping them while allegedly protecting them from the outside world. Upon meeting him, Venom is quick to berate Spider-Man for abandoning him all those years ago with a genuine sense of bitterness and sorrow, describing himself as a responsibility that Spider-Man neglected, leaving the wallcrawler at a loss for words. Defeated, the Sinister Six, Spidey and Venom have their final battle, in which Sandman gives Spider-Man a detonator to make all the Sinners explode. Spidey presses the button, most likely killing Venom and putting an end to his "Reign" once and for all.

Spider-Man: Life Story
In a continuity where characters naturally aged after Peter Parker became Spider-Man in 1962, Peter still acquired the Venom symbiote during the Secret Wars in the 1980s. Unlike the main continuity, Peter discovered that the black suit was a symbiote before Reed Richards did, but initially decided against getting rid of it due to his aging body. When Kraven tried burying Peter alive, the symbiote helped him escape the grave and nearly caused him to kill Kraven before Mary Jane helped separate it from him. The traumatic incident led Mary Jane to leave Peter, who abandoned the symbiote. It then bonded with Kraven before the hunter could commit suicide.

In 2019, the Venom-possessed Kraven attacks Peter and Miles Morales in Doctor Doom's space station as the two heroes attempt to shut down Doom's technology across the planet. When he attempts to let the symbiote possess Miles, he discovers that Otto Octavius is possessing Miles' body, allowing Peter the chance to attack him with a sonic blast from his suit. When the symbiote separates from him, he is nothing more than a skeleton. As Peter stays behind on the space station to ensure the Doomsday Pulse activates, the symbiote helps him one last time by filling in the giant hole of the collapsing station. Once the pulse activates, the station explodes and kills Peter and the symbiote.

Spider-Verse
Several versions of Venom are featured in Spider-Verse:
In Spider-Punk's universe, the Variable Engagement Neuro-sensitive Organic Mesh (aka V.E.N.O.M.) is a suit of armor created by Oscorp and worn by the Thunderbolt Department, the police and fire department of President Osborn. They try to stop protests, but are all defeated by Spider-Punk and his Spider-Slayers.
A female version of Venom is recruited along with the other Spider-Totems by Octavia Otto to fight the Electro-Verse.
A version of Venom is seen by Jessica Drew on the Web of Life and Destiny.

Transformers
In the universe of Earth-91274 where the Transformers series is set, Peter Parker appears still wearing his original Black Suit and goes to cover a story about the evil Decepticons who stole components of a nuclear power plant to build their base in the side of a mountain in Oregon. He briefly clashed with the Autobots, but then Optimus Prime convinced Spider-Man about their good motives. Spider-Man then aids the Autobots against the Decepticons.

Ultimate Marvel 

The Ultimate iteration of Venom was created by writer Brian Michael Bendis and artist Mark Bagley and was introduced in Ultimate Spider-Man #33, while the Conrad Markus version was introduced in Ultimate Spider-Man Volume 2 #16.1. His appearance was designed by Mark Bagley to be more of a monster than a supervillain, describing him as a "huge cancerous/tumorous creature".

Eddie Brock Jr.
The Ultimate Marvel version of Eddie Brock was a writer for the Daily Globe. He was at Justin Hammer's press conference; his face is not shown, only his hands and arms appear. The Ultimate incarnation of Venom is vastly different from the E incarnation: Eddie Brock Jr. is Peter Parker's childhood friend (along with a college student who is a lab assistant for Curtis Connors) and the Venom symbiote is not extraterrestrial but is the second stage of a genetically created "suit" designed by Richard Parker (Peter's father) and Eddie Brock Sr. (Eddie's father) as a cure for severe disease meant to bond to the user and protect them from internal and external harm. The suit is tailored for a specific DNA (Richard's in this case), and the person to whom it belongs can control the suit more easily. If, however, someone uses a suit designed for somebody else, they are constantly damaged by the suit which requires nourishment, gained by feeding on organic flesh, to function. If bonded to an incompatible host the Venom suit begins consuming them almost immediately, forcing them to feed on others to sustain it or die themselves. When taking a host, the organic matter that comprises the suit completely envelops the host, regardless of resistance, temporarily blinding it, before encasing itself in a hard, purple casing, similar to a pupa, as it bonds further with the host. When the host emerges, the suit then shifts its appearance and function to assist its host, such as creating eyes for it to see through, or tries to take it over, inducing a homicidal rage and attempting to feed itself if bonded with an incompatible host. When bonded with a host and forcibly removed, the Venom suit leaves trace amounts of itself in their bloodstream, which attracts other samples of Venom to itself, and can overload Peter's spider-sense. In the video game Ultimate Spider-Man, absorbing the trace amounts in Peter's blood allowed Eddie to take complete control of the suit, gaining a greater ability to talk and a spider symbol on his chest.

Venom's only known weakness is electricity, and larger amounts of the suit will need more electricity to kill, as varying amounts of the suit will be stunned or vaporized by electric shocks. This was first seen in Ultimate Spider-Man #38, when an electric wire got tangled around Venom's foot. An electrocution from live power-lines vaporised the smaller amount on Peter, while a similar amount disabled Eddie. Note in the video game Ultimate Spider-Man, when Electro electrocutes Venom during a cutscene, the suit is not affected by the shock like the live power-line did in the "Venom" arc. The suit can take the Shocker's vibro-shocks, and can protect its host from a bullet, who feels nothing more than a relaxing vibration.

The Venom suit was introduced when Peter Parker reunited with his childhood friend Eddie Brock Jr. to continue their fathers' research into a protoplasmic cure for cancer. Eddie Sr. had kept the suit in the lab for his son as his legacy. After finding that Bolivar Trask had tried to weaponize his father's research, Peter attempted to steal a sample to conduct his own research on, but spilled it by accident. The original Spider-Man (Peter Parker) was able to control the suit to a greater extent than anyone because of his powers and because the suit was designed for his father. Feeding off Spider-Man's own thoughts, the suit enhanced his strength, generated its own webbing, and made him completely bulletproof. But when Spider-Man was chasing down an armed robber, the suit attempted to take over him, growing a fanged maw. After fighting for control, Spider-Man electrocuted the suit before returning to destroy the sample. Enraged, Eddie ignored Peter's warnings and used a second sample of the Venom suit on himself. Eddie, wearing the Venom suit, initially resembled a bulkier version of Spider-Man but the suit grew a fanged mouth, claws, tentacles and spinal ridges. Eddie hunted down Peter, intending to force him to be absorbed in the suit but was electrocuted by downed power lines and retreated.
Eddie was then captured by Silver Sable, who was hired by Bolivar since the suit technically belonged to him and ordered Adrian Toomes to conduct his experiments on the suit in an attempt to remove the suit from Eddie. Then Beetle tried to capture Venom, but Venom escaped and was confronted by Spider-Man. During a battle the suit eventually separated itself from Eddie and forcibly bonded itself with Peter, turning him into Venom. The Ultimates arrived and were able to separate Peter from the suit. Eddie later approached Peter and demanded that he retrieve the suit for him but was rebuffed. During a confrontation between Peter, Eddie and Gwen Stacy, Gwen transformed into Carnage. Contact with Carnage caused trace amounts of the suit within Eddie's body to multiply, transforming him into Venom, at which point the two symbiotes began to fight. After a brief battle the Venom symbiote absorbed all traces of the Carnage symbiote, leaving Gwen an ordinary human, and causing Venom to change into a new form even larger than before, with small glowing red eyes. Venom retreated from battle, and was later captured by the Beetle and taken to Latveria.

Venom appeared with his trademark white spider symbol in Ultimates 3. He attacks the Ultimates' mansion, demanding to find the woman. The Ultimates fight him until Thor strikes him with lightning, turning him into a puddle of organic matter. He is revealed to be an android created by Ultron as a pawn in a master plan.

Conrad Marcus
Conrad Marcus was an employee at Oscorp that helped create the spider behind Miles Morales's powers. An employee of the Roxxon Corporation, Marcus willingly becomes the Venom symbiote's new host and was a more larger Venom than the Eddie Brock's version. When investigative reporter Betty Brant incorrectly assumes that the new Spider-Man (Miles Morales) is Jefferson Davis, Venom kills Betty. Afterwards, Venom destroys Oscorp's abandoned building and later appears at Miles's apartment due to his believing Jefferson to be the new Spider-Man. During the ensuing battle between Venom and Spider-Man, Jefferson is injured and taken to a hospital. Venom appears there, leading to another battle with Spider-Man and the police that accidentally kills both Rio Morales and Marcus.

Venomverse
In Venomverse, various versions of the character are featured as they are recruited to fight off an army of Poisons:

Venom-X23
A version of X23 became bonded to the Venom symbiote while she was trying to escape the facility before they were approached by a Venomized Captain America to join the Venom army.

Venomized Old Man Logan
A version of Old Man Logan was captured by Angel, Spider-Girl (Ashley Barton), and Hulk Jr before being eaten by a symbiote infected Devil Dinosaur. However, the symbiote bonded to Logan and helped him kill his attackers. During the climax of the event, he was presumed dead.

Venomized Deadpool
Deadpool from another universe investigated a facility where illegal experiments were being performed with parasitic worms and bonded to the symbiote to expel the worms inside him. During the events of Venomverse, he was willingly consumed by a Poison so he could act as a double-agent for the Venom army. Following the Poisons' defeat, Venomized Deadpool is presumed dead.

Venomized Gwenpool
In another universe, Gwenpool stole the symbiote from an unknown place and mistakenly wrote Daredevil's secret identity on a piece of paper which her boss acquired. She tries to get it back alongside Daredevil, but discovers that her boss is part of a ninja clan called "Hand" and kills him. During Venomverse, she was consumed by a Poison and killed by Poison Deadpool.

Host Rider
In an alternate universe, Venom was bonded to Robbie Reyes and assumed control over the body alongside the spirit of Eli Morrow. During Venomverse, he was consumed by the Poisons and killed by Carnage.

Venomized Rocket Raccoon
A Venomized Rocket Raccoon was featured in the event. After his universe's Groot was consumed by a Poison, Rocket was forced to kill him. Following this, he became a bounty hunter and tried to kill his universe's Captain America. During Venomverse, he constructed a bomb to destroy the Poisons' base.

Venomized Black Panther
A Venomized version of Black Panther from Earth-TRN654 appears during the event to aid the Venoms in fighting the Poisons. Following the Poisons' defeat, Venom-Panther returned to his dimension.

Ant-Venom
A version of Ant-Man became bonded to Venom and aided Rocket in building a bomb to destroy the Poisons' base. Ant-Venom was later killed by Venom-X23 after a Poison tried to consume him.

Agent Venom
An alternate version of Agent Venom joined the Venom army after being recruited by a Venomized Doctor Strange to fight the Poisons. He tried to calm both 616 Eddie and an alternate Spider-Man (from a universe where he did not remove the symbiote), but they are attacked by the Poisons; during which Agent Venom is killed by a Poison Hulk.

Spider-Man
An alternate version of Spider-Man who reunited with the symbiote after it left Brock was recruited to fight the Poisons. However, he was tricked by a Poison into thinking it was Aunt May and consumed by it; becoming an enemy to Venom before being blown up with the other Poisons Venom-Rocket's bomb.

Venomized Doctor Strange
A Venomized version of Doctor Strange from Earth-TRN644 recruited Venoms from across the multiverse to help him stop the Poisons after they eradicated his Earth and attempted to destroy more. After he was captured by the Poisons, he realized too late that the Poisons feed on Venom symbiotes and he should not have brought the Venoms together. In the climax of the event, he sent all of the surviving Venoms back to their home universes while Venomized Rocket's bomb exploded and took out the Poisons. Venom-Strange's fate is left unknown.

Venomized Captain America
A Venomized version of Captain America makes an appearance recruiting different versions of Venoms from across the multiverse. He was captured by the Poisons in an attempt to convince him join them willingly. When he refused, they consumed him to make him join them. He was later killed by Poison Deadpool.

Black Panther
In the alternate universe of Earth-TRN650, the Venom symbiote was captured by Rhino, who was in Wakanda at the time, and fought Black Panther for it. During the battle Ngozi, a Nigerian girl who is a wheelchair user, became bonded to the symbiote and defeated Rhino after the villain killed T'Challa. As a result, Ngozi and her symbiote took up the mantle of Black Panther.

Venom-Punisher
In the alternate universe of Earth-TRN651, Venom agrees to help the Punisher kill the Kingpin in exchange for the latter helping him kill Spider-Man. After killing the Kingpin, the symbiote possessed Punisher and nearly killed Spider-Man until Venom-Strange recruited him to help fight the Poisons. During the battle, he was consumed by the Poisons and killed by Anti-Venom while invading Earth-616.

What If...?

...The alien costume had possessed Spider-Man? 
In this one-shot, after obtaining the symbiote costume, Spider-Man waits too long before visiting Mr. Fantastic who would free him from the symbiote's control. The suit takes control of Spider-Man and as it constantly feeds on him, Spider-Man ages at an accelerated rate. Within days, Spider-Man dies of old age. Desperate to survive, the symbiote bonds with a weakened Hulk. Thor confronts Venom-Hulk. The costume explains that it is sorry for Spider-Man's death, but is draining the gamma radiation from Bruce Banner as repentance. Thor in disbelief defeats him, leading the symbiote to take over Thor. Banner however is shown cured of being The Hulk. The heroes employ Black Bolt's incredibly powerful voice to create enough sonic damage to critically injure the symbiote.

Thor is freed, and the heroes prepare to transport the alien to another dimension. Black Cat takes matters into her own hands and kills the alien because of anger at the death of Spider-Man.

...Venom had possessed The Punisher? 
In this one-shot issue, after the symbiote leaves Spider-Man, it joins with the Punisher instead of Eddie Brock. Castle uses the symbiote's abilities to further his war on crime; he used the suit's shape-shifting nature to create glider-wings and used its webbing as bullets.

The symbiote causes the Punisher's war to become more brutal and unrestrained than ever before as he set about confronting and killing many super-criminals. The symbiote eventually influences him to confront and beat Spider-Man, but before it can kill the Web Slinger, Castle's soldierly discipline wins out. With his new powers, Punisher takes out Tombstone and even the Kingpin. At the climax of a confrontation with Spider-Man, Daredevil and Moon Knight, from which the Punisher emerges victorious, a blast from Spider-Man's borrowed sonic blaster allows Punisher to overcome and tame the symbiote by convincing it that his war on crime means more to him than anything, even his own life, and would sooner commit suicide and kill them both if he did not have complete control over it.

The symbiote then recedes from Punisher's face and manifests his trademark Skull insignia upon his chest. Castle tells the assembled heroes that he is in control now before making his escape.

...The Marvel Super-Heroes had remained on Battleworld? 
In this one-shot issue, the Marvel Super-Heroes and Villains left alive from the Secret Wars after Galactus' and the Beyonder's fatal battle find themselves trapped on Battleworld. Deciding to make the best of things, they all settle down and build new lives and families. Twenty-five years later, Spider-Man and the Venom symbiote are a single entity. With Reed Richards dead, there was no way to free Spider-Man from the symbiote and thus he was forced to accept this new way of life. Over time he becomes cold, calculating and emotionally distant from the rest of the group. The body of Peter Parker is now nothing more than a skeleton with the symbiote acting as his skin, much to the dismay of the other super-heroes and their children.

...Spider-Man had rejected the Spider? 
This one-shot issue presents a different approach to the events of Spider-Man: The Other, where Peter Parker dies and is resurrected with greater spider powers. Instead, Peter rejects the chance to rise again in a new form and leaves his body and spirit separated. This leaves his body open to a complete takeover by the Venom symbiote. The suit quickly abandons its latest host, Mac Gargan, as soon as it senses Peter's vulnerable state and rushes to once again unite with its first host. After cocooning Peter's body, the symbiote fully bonds with Peter, turning him into a violent monster called Poison. Poison longs for a companion to join them in their new life and chooses Mary Jane. After dispatching the Avengers who rush to her aid, Watson offers herself willingly to prevent any further harm to the people protecting her. She promises Poison that she will give her body but not her soul and make Poison's life as miserable as possible. This seems to leave Poison heartbroken and he flees. Instead, he unearths the grave of Gwen Stacy. The last images reveal Poison watching over a new cocoon like his own, but crimson colored, as it bursts forth showing a hand similar to Carnage's.

...Iron Man: Demon in an Armor 
In this one shot, which happens to take place in Earth-90211, Spider-Man has the Venom symbiote costume. Wade Wilson, as Deadpool, is hired by Galactus to kill the Beyonder for merging MODOK to Galactus's rear end in exchange for the Community Cube. He was given a weapon called the Recton Expungifier, the only weapon that could kill the Beyonder. When Deadpool tracked down his target to a night club, he was enticed into the Beyonder's partying lifestyle, getting Jheri curls in the process. While hanging out with the Beyonder in a flying limousine, Spider-Man broke into the car and demanded the symbiote costume be removed from himself. Beyonder's driver shoots Spider-Man out of the limousine and the symbiote leaves Spider-Man and merges with Deadpool, creating Venompool. However, after years of partying, Beyonder grew tired and threw Venompool to the world, snapping him out of the Beyonder's magic. Venompool attempted to resume his contract and kill the Beyonder, but he accidentally pawned the Recton Expungifier. He decides to get himself clean by kidnapping and selling a drunken Tony Stark to A.I.M. Unfortunately, he cannot join any major superhero teams, like the Avengers, Defenders and Fantastic Four because of his newly acquired Jheri curls.

...Spider-Man: Spider's Shadow
This five-part series offers an alternate take on what would happen if Peter chose to keep the symbiote costume rather than reject it after Reed Richards revealed it was alive. Spider-Man starts acting more aggressive, even unmasking and threatening Hobgoblin (Roderick Kingsley) during an altercation. This leads Kingsley to track him down to May's house, where he blows it up and kills May in the process. Enraged, Peter brutally murders Hobgoblin and decides to take justice into his own hands by killing any criminals that come in his way. After Spider-Man seemingly kills the Kingpin, the Sinister Six (consisting of Kraven, Electro, Rhino, Mysterio, Eddie Brock possessing Doctor Octopus' arms and a reluctant J. Jonah Jameson) assemble in the countryside to take him down. Though Spider-Man kills Electro, Rhino, and Mysterio, Kraven and Jameson separate Peter from the symbiote after discovering its weakness to fire.

Jameson takes Peter home, where they meet up with Mary Jane and Black Cat and find out that Kingpin had leaked Spider-Man's secret identity to the press. As Felicia takes Jameson to safety, Peter and Mary Jane discover that the symbiote has possessed Reed and taken over the Baxter Building, where it has used his scientific knowledge to make itself stronger and take control of anyone inside, including the Thing. Knowing the suit still wants him, Peter ventures into the building with Mary Jane and the Human Torch, where they find out that the symbiote used Reed to create other symbiotes to possess the other heroes present near the building. It then orders them to attack Mary Jane, as Peter's love for her is what prevented it from taking over him completely. Spider-Man and the Torch then lure the symbiote back to the Baxter Building, where Peter offers himself to the symbiote willingly. After the symbiote kills Reed, it attempts to bond to Peter again, however it is revealed that "Peter" was actually a disguised Torch using Reed's image inducer that the real Peter gave him, allowing him to annihilate the symbiote with his flames. Peter turned himself in for the murders, but was ultimately declared not guilty since the other heroes who were possessed by symbiotes testified on his behalf. Susan Storm invites Peter to join the Fantastic Four to take Reed's place.

In the epilogue, it is revealed that Kingpin barely survived Spider-Man's brutal assault and is determined to get revenge on Peter. His assistant Wesley reveals that his doctors have gotten ahold of one of the symbiote's offspring, which resembles Carnage, to help him recover and give him the power he needs to take on Spider-Man.

What The--?!
In the Spider-Ham parody, What The--?!, "The Bee-Yonder" gives Spider-Ham a version of the black uniform. In issue #20, Pork Grind, a pig version of Venom is introduced as an enemy of Peter Porker, the Spectacular Spider-Ham. He was a Wild Boar from Australia, who accepted a deal with a supervillain to become Pork Grind, because every Superhero needs to have an evil counterpart. He was much stronger than Spider-Ham, who was smashed by him like paper. Spider-Ham in an attempt to stop Pork Grind, he ate some spinach and was able to finally defeat him.

In other media

Television
 Venom appears in Spider-Man: The Animated Series, with Spider-Man's version voiced by Christopher Daniel Barnes and Eddie Brock's version voiced by Hank Azaria. In the three-part episode "The Alien Costume", Spider-Man bonds with the symbiote before rejecting it, after which it bonds to Brock, turning him into Venom. They seek revenge on Spider-Man, who defeats and separates them before sending Venom back to space. In the episodes "Venom Returns" and "Carnage", Venom returns to Earth, re-fuses with Brock, and joins forces with Spider-Man and Iron Man to combat Carnage, Dormammu, and Baron Mordo before Venom and Brock sacrifice themselves to ensure the villains' defeat.
 The Eddie Brock incarnation of Venom appears in Spider-Man Unlimited (1999), voiced by Brian Drummond. This version of the Venom symbiote evolved into a more powerful form, gaining full control of its host's body as well as acquiring elastic powers and the ability to change into a liquid-esque form. Venom and Carnage travel to Counter-Earth to join the Synoptic, a hive mind of symbiotes, and ally themselves with the High Evolutionary while secretly helping the Synoptic grow powerful enough to infect the planet's population with symbiotes.
 Venom appears in The Spectacular Spider-Man, with Spider-Man's version voiced by Josh Keaton and Eddie Brock's version voiced by Benjamin Diskin. Introduced in the episode "The Uncertainly Principle", the symbiote arrives on Earth by stowing away on John Jameson space shuttle and bonds to Spider-Man. After being rejected by Spider-Man, it bonds with Brock to seek revenge in the episode "Intervention", but is ultimately defeated in the episode "Nature vs. Nurture". Venom reappears in the episodes "First Steps", "Growing Pains", and "Identity Crisis", wherein it rejoins Brock and attempts to expose Spider-Man's secret identity, only to be foiled and separated from Brock once more, though it manages to escape.
 Venom appears in Ultimate Spider-Man, with Harry Osborn and Flash Thompson's versions voiced by Matt Lanter and the Green Goblin's version voiced by Steven Weber. Introduced in its self-titled episode, this version of the Venom symbiote is created by Doctor Octopus using a sample of Spider-Man's blood. After it escapes from its creator, it temporarily fuses with a number of individuals, such as Thompson and Spider-Man, until it eventually bonds with Harry who tries to become a hero to impress his father in the episode "Back in Black". However, the Green Goblin takes it for himself in the episode "The Rise of the Green Goblin" and, over the course of the episodes "Carnage", "Venom Bomb", and "The Avenging Spider-Man", uses the symbiote to create the Carnage symbiote, infect himself and the S.H.I.E.L.D. Helicarrier, and create more symbiotic monsters with help from Loki, but is foiled by Harry, Spider-Man and Doc Ock's Anti-Venom formula, and the Avengers respectively. A piece of the symbiote that survived fighting the Avengers later bonds with the Scorpion and Thompson, who shows an unusual amount of control over it and becomes Agent Venom for the rest of the series.
 Venom appears in Phineas and Ferb: Mission Marvel, voiced by Danny Trejo.
 Venom appears in the Hulk and the Agents of S.M.A.S.H. episode "The Venom Inside". Doctor Octopus creates a new version of the Venom symbiote that gradually assimilates the Agents of S.M.A.S.H. to absorb their gamma energy and destroy Spider-Man. However, the Agents of S.M.A.S.H. and Spider-Man eventually manage to defeat the Venom symbiote.
 Venom appears in Marvel Disk Wars: The Avengers, with Spider-Man's version voiced by Robbie Daymond.
 Venom appears in Lego Marvel Super Heroes: Maximum Overload, voiced by Dee Bradley Baker.
 Venom appears in Spider-Man (2017), with Spider-Man's version voiced again by Robbie Daymond, Eddie Brock's version voiced by Ben Pronsky, and the symbiote in its true form voiced by Benjamin Diskin. First appearing in the episode "A Day in the Life", the V-252 symbiote is found inside a meteorite by a space program and sent to Horizon High for research. The symbiote briefly merges with Spider-Man from the episode "Sandman" until "Stark Expo", and Flash Thompson during the episode "Venom" before it is recaptured. In season two, the V-252 merges with Eddie Brock, who renames it Venom in the episode "Dead Man's Party". In the episode "Venom Returns", Venom is incapacitated by an experimental sonic device during a failed attempt to publicly expose Spider-Man's secret identity, which leaves Brock in a coma. In the episode "Superior", Venom is reawakened by experimentation that alters its genealogy, enabling it to survive without a host, but it is defeated by Spider-Man. In the episodes "Web of Venom" Pt. 2 and "Amazing Friends", Venom is accidentally freed by Dr. Curt Connors and absorbs a synthetic copy. It returns to the meteorite and uses an energy seed to shoot a beacon into space. Despite being killed by Spider-Man, an army of Venom's fellow Klyntar invade Earth. In the series finale, "Maximum Venom", a fragment of Venom is revealed to have survived and bonded with Max Modell. Seeking revenge on Spider-Man for thwarting its race's invasion, it builds a portal to its home planet and summons several Klyntar, but they are defeated by Spider-Man's allies while Modell overcomes Venom's control and destroys its seed, permanently vanquishing the symbiote.
 A Battleworld incarnation of Venom appears in the Avengers Assemble episode "The Immortal Weapon". After the Beyonder forms Battleworld for an experiment, a satellite containing a Venom symbiote crashes into K'un-L'un, allowing it to escape, find its way to Dracula, and bond with him. Using his new powers, the vampire fights off Iron Fist, Black Panther, and Falcon before Iron Fist uses his powers to separate Dracula from the symbiote.
 Venom appears in the Guardians of the Galaxy episode "Drive My Carnage". A sample of it was held at Horizon High and possesses Spider-Man during the Guardians of the Galaxy's fight with a Carnage-possessed Thanos.

Film
Venom's first appearance in a motion picture was originally planned for a titular film written by David S. Goyer and produced by New Line Cinema, in which Venom would have been portrayed as an antihero and Carnage as the antagonist. By 2007, the film rights to Venom had reverted to Sony Pictures.

In March 2012, Josh Trank was in talks to direct a new Venom film as a part of The Amazing Spider-Man film series. In December 2013, Sony officially announced two spin-offs of The Amazing Spider-Man film series, one of which was a Venom film called Venom: Carnage, written by Alex Kurtzman, Roberto Orci and Ed Solomon, with Kurtzman directing it. In September 2014, Kurtzman stated that they had been considering different incarnations of the character, including Eddie Brock, Anne Weying, and Flash Thompson. The movie, along with the other spin-offs, was cancelled prior to the studios' contract agreement with Marvel Studios.

Spider-Man trilogy
Venom appears in Spider-Man 3, with Peter Parker's version portrayed by Tobey Maguire and Eddie Brock's version portrayed by Topher Grace. After landing on Earth, the symbiote bonds with Spider-Man until he eventually rejects it, after which it bonds with Brock and forms an alliance with Flint Marko to kill Spider-Man, only to be killed by Spider-Man via one of the New Goblin's pumpkin bombs.

In July 2007, Sony executive Avi Arad revealed a spin-off of Sam Raimi's Spider-Man trilogy focused on the still-alive Venom symbiote was in the planning stages, with Jacob Aaron Estes commissioned to write a script, tentatively entitled Venom. In September 2008, Rhett Reese and Paul Wernick signed on to write the film after Estes' script was rejected, while Gary Ross would direct. Variety reported that Venom would become an anti-hero in the film, and Marvel Entertainment would produce the film. This potential film was ultimately cancelled.

Sony's Spider-Man Universe

In March 2016, following the introduction of Spider-Man to the Marvel Cinematic Universe, it was announced that Sony was moving forward with a standalone film after hiring Dante Harper to write the script, and Arad, Matt Tolmach and Amy Pascal producing. The film was initially reported to have no connection to the MCU nor have any relation to Spider-Man; it would be set in its own continuity. A year later, Sony announced that Venom would be released on October 5, 2018, with Scott Rosenberg and Jeff Pinkner signed on as screenwriters. It was reported to be Rated R and the first in a series of Spider-Man character-related spin-off films called the "Sony Pictures Universe of Marvel Characters", later renamed to Sony's Spider-Man Universe. In May 2017, Tom Hardy was announced to be cast as Eddie Brock / Venom, with Ruben Fleischer attached to direct. Carlton Drake / Riot appeared as the film's primary antagonist, as did Anne Weying, Brock's ex-wife from the comics. The film has been described by Fleischer as taking inspiration from the works of David Cronenberg and John Carpenter. The supporting cast also consists of Riz Ahmed, Michelle Williams, and Jenny Slate. Variety reported that Kelly Marcel would write the script with Pinkner and Rosenberg. Filming officially began on October 23, 2017. Venom was released in the United States on October 5, 2018, with a PG-13 rating.

A sequel, Venom: Let There Be Carnage was released in the United States on October 1, 2021. Loosely adapting the events of the "Maximum Carnage" comic book story arc and The Venom Saga from the 1994 Spider-Man animated series, the film sees Venom and Brock having to battle Cletus Kasady / Carnage and Shriek while also learning how to better live and work together as the "Lethal Protector". The film's post-credits scene sees Eddie and Venom being transported to the Marvel Cinematic Universe (MCU), where they witness J. Jonah Jameson expose Peter Parker's identity as Spider-Man on television. This is continued in the mid-credits scene of the MCU film Spider-Man: No Way Home (2021), where, just as the pair begin to learn about the heroes and major events that occurred in this universe, they are taken back to their home dimension by Doctor Strange's spell along with other universe-displaced individuals; inadvertently leaving behind a piece of the symbiote.

Video games

Spider-Man games
 The Eddie Brock incarnation of Venom appears as a boss in the Sega Mega-CD version of The Amazing Spider-Man vs. The Kingpin.
 The Eddie Brock incarnation of Venom appears as a playable character in Spider-Man and Venom: Maximum Carnage and Venom/Spider-Man: Separation Anxiety.
 The Eddie Brock incarnation of Venom appears as a boss in The Amazing Spider-Man: Lethal Foes.
 The Eddie Brock incarnation of Venom appears as the final boss of Spider-Man (1995).
 The Eddie Brock incarnation of Venom appears as a boss, later a supporting character, in Spider-Man (2000), voiced by Daran Norris.
 The Ultimate Marvel iteration of Eddie Brock / Venom appears as a playable character in and the final boss of the Ultimate Spider-Man video game, voiced by Daniel Capallaro and Arthur Burghardt respectively. Additionally, the symbiote suit is also available as an alternate skin for Spider-Man.
 The Eddie Brock incarnation of Venom appears in the Spider-Man 3 film tie-in game, voiced by Topher Grace. Similarly to the film, Spider-Man removes the symbiote after it becomes a negative influence on his behavior, only for it to then bond with Brock, who seeks revenge against both Spider-Man and Peter Parker. Adopting the alias Venom, he blackmails the Sandman into helping him kill Spider-Man, only to meet his demise in the ensuing fight.
 The Eddie Brock incarnation of Venom appears as a playable character in Spider-Man: Friend or Foe, voiced by Quinton Flynn.
 The Eddie Brock incarnation of Venom appears as the final boss of Spider-Man: Web of Shadows, voiced by Keith Szarabajka. While leading a symbiote invasion, a piece of the Venom symbiote splits off from him and bonds with Spider-Man, re-granting him access to his symbiote suit. Eventually, Spider-Man appeals to Brock's better nature and, depending on the player's choices, will either kill Venom himself or allow Brock to sacrifice himself to do so.
 In the PS2 and PSP versions of the game, the Tinkerer captures Venom after he attacks Manhattan with his symbiote army and the final boss is a large symbiote with seven heads that contains Venom's consciousness.
 In the Nintendo DS version, Venom is not the cause of the invasion. Instead, he is trying to stop it as well, and becomes an ally of Spider-Man's after the web-slinger defeats him.
 The Ultimate Marvel incarnation of the Venom symbiote suit appears in Spider-Man: Shattered Dimensions, in which Madame Web provides a copy of it to the Ultimate Spider-Man (voiced by Josh Keaton) and telepathically controls it to prevent it from consuming him.
 Two versions of the symbiote suit appear as alternate costumes for Spider-Man in The Amazing Spider-Man. One is based on its appearance in the Spider-Man 3 film and the other is a modified version of Spider-Man's costume from the film the game is based on. Backstory for the game also reveals that the game's version of Scorpion was created using a "black goo" recovered from space.
 A variation of the Venom symbiote appears in The Amazing Spider-Man 2. Oscorp runs a secret experiment at Ravencroft called the "Venom Project", using nanites as regenerating body armor that grant enhanced strength. This project later gives Cletus Kasady the Carnage symbiote. The symbiote suit is also available as an alternate costume for Spider-Man via DLC.
 The Eddie Brock incarnation of Venom appears in the mobile version of the game, voiced again by Benjamin Diskin.
 The Venom symbiote via Spider-Man, Eddie Brock, Anne Weying as She-Venom, Flash Thompson as Agent Venom, Angelo Fortunato, Otto Octavius as Superior Venom, Pork Grind, Lee Price as Maniac, and Inkling versions of Black Cat, Hammerhead, and Mac Gargan all appear as separate playable characters in Spider-Man Unlimited (2014). Additionally, the Eddie Brock incarnation of Venom appears as a boss in the "Symbiote Dimension" limited time event.
 A black, web-like, reactive substance later confirmed to be Venom appears in Marvel's Spider-Man. Norman Osborn places his terminally ill son Harry in a green vat containing the substance in an attempt to cure him.
 Venom will appear in Marvel's Spider-Man 2, voiced by Tony Todd.

Other games
 The Eddie Brock incarnation of Venom appears as a playable character in Marvel vs. Capcom: Clash of Super Heroes.
 The Eddie Brock incarnation of Venom appears as a playable character in Marvel vs. Capcom 2: New Age of Heroes, voiced by Rod Wilson.
 The symbiote suit appears as an unlockable costume for Spider-Man in X-Men: Mutant Academy 2.
 The Eddie Brock incarnation of Venom appears as a playable character in Marvel Nemesis: Rise of the Imperfects, voiced by Jason Bryden.
 The Eddie Brock incarnation appears in the Xbox 360 version of Marvel: Ultimate Alliance, voiced by Steve Blum. He appears via the "Villains Pack" DLC. Additionally, the Angelo Fortunato and Mac Gargan incarnations and Venom's Ultimate Marvel design appear as alternate skins while the symbiote suit appears as an alternate skin for Spider-Man.
 The Eddie Brock incarnation of Venom appears in LittleBigPlanet via the "Marvel Costume Kit 3" DLC.
 The Mac Gargan incarnation appears as a boss and playable character in Marvel: Ultimate Alliance 2, voiced by Chopper Bernet. Additionally, Eddie Brock's incarnation appears as an alternate skin. In the game's story, Venom is among the villains placed under mind control using nanite technology to serve the heroes' cause and can be on either the pro-registration or anti-registration side. During a battle between the two factions, Venom is among the villains that attack S.H.I.E.L.D. agents and set up bombs after the nanites attain sentience.
 In the PS3, Xbox 360, PS4, Xbox One, and PC versions, Venom is an unlockable playable character. In the story, the heroes fight Venom and the Green Goblin and eventually defeat and cure them.
 The symbiote suit appears as an unlockable costume for Spider-Man in Marvel vs. Capcom 3: Fate of Two Worlds.
 The Eddie Brock incarnation of Venom appears as a playable character in Marvel Super Hero Squad Online, voiced by Travis Willingham. Additionally, the symbiote suit also appears as an alternate skin for Spider-Man.
 The symbiote suit appears as an unlockable alternate skin for Spider-Man in Ultimate Marvel vs. Capcom 3.
 The Eddie Brock incarnation of Venom appears as a playable character in Marvel Avengers: Battle for Earth, voiced by Roger Craig Smith.
 The Eddie Brock incarnation of Venom appears as a playable character in Marvel Heroes, voiced by Neil Kaplan. The black suit also appears as an alternate costume for Spider-Man.
 The Eddie Brock, Mac Gargan, and Flash Thompson incarnations of Venom all appear as a playable characters in Marvel Puzzle Quest.
 The Eddie Brock incarnation of Venom appears as a playable character and boss in Lego Marvel Super Heroes, voiced by Dave Boat. Additionally, the symbiote suit is available as an alternate skin for Spider-Man via DLC.
 The Eddie Brock incarnation of Venom appears as a playable character in Disney Infinity 2.0, voiced by Matt Lanter.
 The Eddie Brock incarnation of Venom appears as a playable character and occasional boss in Marvel Contest of Champions. Additionally, VenomPool (a mixture of Venom and Deadpool), Venom the Duck (a mixture of Venom and Howard the Duck), and the Symbiote Supreme (a mixture of Venom and Doctor Strange) also appear as playable characters.
 The Eddie Brock incarnation of Venom appears as a playable character in Marvel: Future Fight.
 The Eddie Brock incarnation of Venom appears in Disney Infinity 3.0, voiced again by Matt Lanter.
 The Eddie Brock incarnation of Venom appears as a playable character in Marvel Avengers Academy, voiced by Brian Stivale.
 The Eddie Brock incarnation of Venom appears as a downloadable playable character in Marvel vs. Capcom: Infinite, voiced by Andrew Morgado.
 The Eddie Brock and Flash Thompson incarnations of Venom appear as playable characters in Lego Marvel Super Heroes 2.
 The Eddie Brock incarnation appears as a boss and a playable character in Marvel Ultimate Alliance 3: The Black Order, voiced again by Steve Blum.
 The Eddie Brock incarnation of Venom appears as a non-player character, later a downloadable playable character, in Marvel's Midnight Suns, voiced by Darin De Paul.

Miscellaneous
 The Eddie Brock incarnation of Venom appears in the The Ultimate Spider-Man short story collection book as part of the short story "An Evening in the Bronx with Venom", by Keith R.A. DeCandido.
 The Eddie Brock incarnation of Venom appears in the Adi Shankar's Bootleg Universe fan film Truth In Journalism, portrayed by Ryan Kwanten and Denis Sergovskiy respectively. This version of the latter was realized via a suit created by Robert Pendergraft and the makeup effects house Aunt Dolly's Garage, based on Todd McFarlane's original Venom sketches, with Rainfall Films designing a computer-generated head and tendrils. For the film's "vomit" scene, Rainfall concocted a mixture of maple syrup, soy sauce, and flour, which was shot separately and digitally inserted into the scene.

Reception
Originally David Michelinie planned to kill Venom in Amazing Spider-Man #400, and have other villains become the host. However due to the popularity of the character Marvel would not allow this, leading him to create Carnage instead.

Comics journalist and historian Mike Conroy writes of the character: "What started out as a replacement costume for Spider-Man turned into one of the Marvel web-slinger's greatest nightmares." Venom was ranked as the 22nd Greatest Comic Book Villain of All Time in IGN's list of the top 100 comic villains. IGN also ranked Mac Gargan's incarnation of Venom as #17 in their list of "The Top 50 Avengers", while the Flash Thompson incarnation was ranked as #27. The character was listed as #33 on Empires 50 Greatest Comic Book Characters and was also ranked at #8 in Marvel'''s Top 10 Spider-Verse Characters. Spike Chunsoft and Danganronpa'' mascot Monokuma was designed by Rui Komatsuzaki and Kazutaka Kodaka to partially resemble Venom.

See also
List of Venom titles

References

External links
 
 
 
 
 History of the alien costume on Marvel.com
 List of Venom Comics at TheVenomSite.com
 "Venom (Angelo Fortunate; Spider-Man foe)". The Appendix to the Handbook of the Marvel Universe
 
 Venom at Comic Vine
 Venom at Spider-Man Wiki
 Venom at Villains Wiki

Villains in animated television series
Articles about multiple fictional characters
Characters created by David Michelinie
Characters created by Mike Zeck
Characters created by Todd McFarlane
Comics by Todd McFarlane
Comics characters introduced in 1984
Comics characters introduced in 1988
Fictional amorphous creatures
Fictional characters who can duplicate themselves
Fictional characters who can turn invisible
Fictional characters with healing abilities
Fictional humanoids
Fictional mass murderers
Fictional parasites and parasitoids
Fictional prison escapees
Fictional stalkers
Fictional super soldiers
Horror comics
Incarnations of Spider-Man
Kree
Marvel Comics adapted into films
Marvel Comics adapted into video games
Marvel Comics aliens
Marvel Comics characters who are shapeshifters
Marvel Comics characters who can move at superhuman speeds
Marvel Comics characters with accelerated healing
Marvel Comics characters with superhuman strength
Marvel Comics film characters
Marvel Comics extraterrestrial superheroes
Marvel Comics extraterrestrial supervillains
Marvel Comics male supervillains
Marvel Comics superheroes
Marvel Comics male superheroes
Marvel Comics telepaths
Marvel Comics titles
Merged fictional characters
Spider-Man characters